Eisenia is a brown alga genus in the family Lessoniaceae. The genus is named for California Academy of Sciences curator, Gustav Eisen.

The genus was circumscribed by John Erhard Areschoug in Bot. Not. (1876) on page 68 in 1876  

Eisenia bicyclis is a species of kelp best known for its use in Japanese cuisine.

Species
 Eisenia arborea
 Eisenia bicyclis
 Eisenia cokeri
 Eisenia desmarestioides
 Eisenia galapagensis
 Eisenia gracilis
 Eisenia masonii

References

External links
 

Lessoniaceae
Laminariales genera